Myotubularin-related protein 9 is a protein that in humans is encoded by the MTMR9 gene.

Function 

This gene encodes a myotubularin-related protein that is atypical to most other members of the myotubularin-related protein family because it has no dual-specificity phosphatase domain. The encoded protein contains a double-helical motif similar to the SET interaction domain, which is thought to have a role in the control of cell proliferation. In mouse, a protein similar to the encoded protein binds with MTMR7, and together they dephosphorylate phosphatidylinositol 3-phosphate and inositol 1,3-bisphosphate.

Interactions 

MTMR9 has been shown to interact with MTMR6.

References

Further reading